CNBC Titans is a documentary television series airing on CNBC featuring some of the most famous personalities, companies, and entrepreneurs in the world of business.

Those featured on the show are the following.

George Foreman (August 11, 2010)
Ted Turner (September 22, 2010)
Hugh Hefner (October 13, 2010)
Donald Trump (November 17, 2010)
Merv Griffin (December 2, 2010)
Steve Jobs (June 23, 2011)
Procter & Gamble (July 7, 2011)
Herb Kelleher (July 14, 2011)
Quincy Jones (July 21, 2011)
Milton Hershey (July 28, 2011)
Lee Iacocca (August 11, 2011)
Barry Diller (August 18, 2011)
Leo Burnett (August 25, 2011)

External links
 Official site

References

2010 American television series debuts
2010s American television news shows
CNBC original programming
2011 American television series endings